Zeacolpus is a genus of medium-sized sea snails, marine gastropod molluscs in the family Turritellidae, known as the turritellas or tower shells.

Species
Species within the genus Zeacolpus include:
 Zeacolpus capricornius Garrard, 1972
 Zeacolpus fulminatus Hutton, 1873
 Zeacolpus vittatus (Hutton, 1873)
Species brought into synonymy 
 Zeacolpus ahiparanus (Powell, 1927) : synonym of Stiracolpus ahiparanus (Powell, A.W.B., 1927)
 Zeacolpus ascensus Marwick, 1957 : synonym of Stiracolpus pagoda (Reeve, 1849)
 Zeacolpus blacki Marwick, 1957 : synonym of Stiracolpus pagoda (Reeve, 1849)
 Zeacolpus delli Marwick, 1957 : synonym of Stiracolpus pagoda (Reeve, 1849)
 Zeacolpus knoxi knoxi Marwick, 1957 : synonym of Stiracolpus pagoda (Reeve, 1849)
 Zeacolpus knoxi tardior Marwick, 1957  : synonym of Stiracolpus pagoda (Reeve, 1849)
 Zeacolpus maorius (Powell, 1940) : synonym of Stiracolpus pagoda (Reeve, 1849)
 Zeacolpus mixtus Finlay, 1930 : synonym of Stiracolpus pagoda (Reeve, 1849)
 Zeacolpus pagodus (Reeve, 1849) : synonym of Stiracolpus pagoda (Reeve, 1849)
 Zeacolpus pagoda pagoda (Reeve, 1849) : synonym of Stiracolpus pagoda (Reeve, 1849)
 Zeacolpus pagoda powelli Marwick, 1957 : synonym of Stiracolpus pagoda (Reeve, 1849)
 Zeacolpus symmetricus (Hutton, 1873) : synonym of Stiracolpus symmetricus (Hutton, 1873)

References

 Powell A. W. B., New Zealand Mollusca, William Collins Publishers Ltd, Auckland, New Zealand 1979 

Turritellidae
Taxa named by Harold John Finlay